Griswold Pass is a mountain pass in the Pacific Ranges of the Coast Mountains of British Columbia, located at the head of Nichols Creek, a tributary of the upper Bridge River (S), and the head of Griswold Creek, a tributary of the Lord River (N), which feeds the Taseko Lakes and is effectively a tributary of the Taseko River (which enters those lakes separately).  The Nichols Creek area is part of the volcanic formation known as the Bridge River Cones, while to the north of the pass the Taseko Lakes basin is part of Tsy'los Provincial Park.

See also
List of mountain passes
Lord Pass
Warner Pass
Elbow Pass
Tyoax Pass
Grizzly Pass
Wolverine Pass
Spruce Lake Protected Area (begins just east of Griswold Pass)

References

Pacific Ranges
Bridge River Country
Landforms of the Chilcotin
Mountain passes of British Columbia